Ruth Drexel (14 July 1930 – 26 February 2009) was a German actress, director, and theatre director/manager. Her best-known role was as "Resi Berghammer" in the German television series,
Der Bulle von Tölz, in which she played the  mother of the eponymous cop. As of January 2006, she played the role in 58 episodes.

Life and career
Born in Vilshofen an der Donau, near Passau, Drexel trained as an actress in Munich, where she was also given her first engagement. She subsequently worked in Berlin (as a member of the Berliner Ensemble during 1955–56), Wuppertal, Darmstadt and Düsseldorf. She also appeared, to great critical acclaim, in new plays by Franz Xaver Kroetz and Felix Mitterer. In 1980, she co-founded the Tiroler Volksschauspiele in Telfs, Tyrol.

Drexel's early television work included Wedekind's Der Marquis von Keith (1962), a German adaptation of Shaw's Candida (1963), Frisch's Biedermann und die Brandstifter (1967), and Kroetz's  (Jail Bait), directed by Rainer Werner Fassbinder (1973). She also put in guest appearances on Der Kommissar and Tatort.

Drexel was a member of the cast of the cult television series  (1974) and Zur Freiheit (1987). In 2005, she started a new television series, 
Agathe kann's nicht lassen, playing Agathe Heiland, an elderly sleuth modelled on Agatha Christie's Miss Marple.

Family
Ruth Drexel was married once, to Michael Adami. They had a daughter, Katharina Adami (b. 1956). Drexel had a second child, Cilli Drexel (b. 1975) by her long-time companion, actor Hans Brenner.

Death
Drexel's long-time companion, actor Hans Brenner, died in 1998. Until her own death from cancer in 2009, aged 78, Ruth Drexel lived in Feldkirchen, near Munich.

Filmography

References

External links
 
 Ruth Drexel great Interview, German

1930 births
2009 deaths
People from Vilshofen an der Donau
Deaths from cancer in Germany
German stage actresses
German television actresses
German theatre directors
20th-century German actresses
21st-century German actresses